Iraq competed at the 2017 Asian Indoor and Martial Arts Games in Ashgabat, Turkmenistan from September 17 to 27. Iraq won 13 medals during the multi-sport event including 4 gold medals. Iraq sent a delegation consisting of 51 participants for the event.

3x3 Basketball 

Iraq men's national 3x3 basketball team secured the silver medal after emerging as the runners-up in the men's category by beating Qatar with a score of 22-12 in the finals.

Participants

Medallists

References 

Nations at the 2017 Asian Indoor and Martial Arts Games
2017 in Iraqi sport